Knotting may refer to:
tying a knot
Knotting, Bedfordshire, a village in England
Copulatory tie, an aspect of canine reproduction
Knotting, a trope in Omegaverse erotic fiction, derived from the copulatory tie